Yongqiao District is a district of the city of Suzhou, Anhui Province, China.

Administrative divisions
Nowadays, Yongqiao District is divided to 11 subdistricts, 15 towns and 10 townships.
11 Subdistricts

15 Towns

10 Townships

References

County-level divisions of Anhui
Suzhou, Anhui